Nierembergia rivularis, the whitecup or water neirembergia, is a species of ornamental plant in the Solanaceae family. The species is also commonly known as chuscho.

It is native to Argentina, Bolivia, Brazil, and Uruguay.

It has caused enzootic calcinosis in sheep in Uruguay.

References

Petunioideae